The Cape Race LORAN-C transmitter was a LORAN-C transmitter at Cape Race, Newfoundland and Labrador, on Canada's eastern seaboard.

The Cape Race LORAN-C transmitter was used as an antenna tower until February 2, 1993.  It was a 411.48 m (1350 ft) tall guyed mast, built in 1965. This mast was the tallest structure in Canada until the construction of the CN Tower in Toronto, and remained the second-tallest structure until its collapse on February 2, 1993.  The collapse was the result of a  fatigue failure of the eyebolt head in a compression cone insulator on a structural guy-wire.  This failure caused swing-in damage that resulted in the tower's collapse. The tower was replaced by a 260.3 meter (854 ft) tall guyed mast, insulated against the ground.

The Cape Race LORAN-C transmitter was used until 1993 as part of the LORAN-C Chain GRI 9930 and worked with a transmission power of 1800 kilowatts. The Cape Race LORAN-C transmitter acted as the Yankee Secondary Transmitter of the Canadian East Coast LORAN-C chain (GRI 5930) and as the Whiskey Secondary of the Newfoundland East Coast LORAN-C chain (GRI 7270).

The transmission power for the Canadian East Coast LORAN-C chain was 1000 kW, and for the Newfoundland East Coast LORAN-C the transmission power was 500 kW. The mast has been demolished.

See also
 List of masts
 List of tallest buildings and structures in Canada

External links
 
 Cape Race LORAN-C Transmission Mast (1st), Portugal Cove South - SkyscraperPage.com
 Cape Race LORAN-C Transmission Mast (2nd), Portugal Cove South - SkyscraperPage.com
 
 
Video of the demolition

LORAN-C transmitters in Canada
Buildings and structures in Newfoundland and Labrador
1965 establishments in Newfoundland and Labrador